Abner Oakes III (13 February 1934 - 29 May 2021) was a Canadian ice hockey player and coach who spent his entire athletic career with Dartmouth.

Career
After graduating from Phillips Academy, Abner Oakes attended Dartmouth College in the autumn of 1952, playing for the ice hockey team under Eddie Jeremiah. Oakes began his career as a forward but was shifted to defence during his second season and remained there until he graduated in 1956. Afterwards Oakes signed up for active duty in the United States Navy, serving four years before becoming a naval reservist.

While in the reserves Oakes returned to Dartmouth and served as an assistant under Jeremiah at the end of Jeremiah's career. When Jeremiah stepped away from the team for the 1963-64 season, so that he could coach the 1964 men's Olympic team, Oakes served as an interim head coach and three years later became the full-time bench boss when Jeremiah retired. Oakes stayed with the Big Green until 1970 before stepping down and moving to Hamden, Connecticut. He served in the reserves until 1988, retiring as a Commander. In 2010 Oakes was inducted into the Connecticut Veterans Hall of Fame.

Head coaching record

References

External links

1934 births
2021 deaths
Canadian ice hockey defencemen
Dartmouth Big Green men's ice hockey coaches
Dartmouth Big Green men's ice hockey players
Ice hockey people from Quebec
Anglophone Quebec people
People from Shawinigan
Phillips Academy alumni
 United States Navy officers
People from Hamden, Connecticut